Gitamohan Tripura is a Indian politician from Tripura. He is a member of Communist Party of India (Marxist) who won the election in 1998 from Jolaibari.

References

Tripura MLAs 1998–2003
Year of birth missing (living people)
Living people
Place of birth missing (living people)
Tripura politicians